The canton of Couserans Ouest is an administrative division of the Ariège department, southern France. It was created at the French canton reorganisation which came into effect in March 2015. Its seat is in Saint-Girons.

It consists of the following communes:
 
Antras
Argein
Arrien-en-Bethmale
Arrout
Aucazein
Audressein
Augirein
Balacet
Balaguères
Bethmale
Bonac-Irazein
Bordes-Uchentein
Buzan
Castillon-en-Couserans
Cescau
Engomer
Eycheil
Galey
Illartein
Montégut-en-Couserans
Moulis
Orgibet
Saint-Girons
Saint-Jean-du-Castillonnais
Saint-Lary
Salsein
Sentein
Sor
Villeneuve

References

Cantons of Ariège (department)